Richard Payn (fl. 1383–1386), of Shaftesbury, Dorset, was an English Member of Parliament.

Payn was married with one son. His wife and son's names are unrecorded.

He was a Member (MP) of the Parliament of England for Shaftesbury in 1386. He was Mayor of Shaftesbury Michaelmas in 1383–84.

References

14th-century births
Year of death missing
English MPs 1386
Mayors of Shaftesbury